Robin Dale Hanson (born August 28, 1959) is an associate professor of economics at George Mason University and a research associate at the Future of Humanity Institute of Oxford University. He is known for his work on idea futures and markets, and he was involved in the creation of the Foresight Institute's Foresight Exchange and DARPA's FutureMAP project. He invented market scoring rules like LMSR (Logarithmic Market Scoring Rule) used by prediction markets such as Consensus Point (where Hanson is Chief Scientist), and has conducted research on signalling.

Background
Hanson received a BS in physics from the University of California, Irvine in 1981, an MS in physics and an MA in Conceptual Foundations of Science from the University of Chicago in 1984, and a PhD in social science from Caltech in 1997 for his thesis titled Four puzzles in information and politics: Product bans, informed voters, social insurance, and persistent disagreement. Before getting his PhD he researched artificial intelligence, Bayesian statistics and hypertext publishing at Lockheed, NASA, and elsewhere. In addition, he started the first internal corporate prediction market at Xanadu in 1990.

He is married to Peggy Jackson, a hospice social worker, and has two children.  He is the son of a Southern Baptist preacher. Hanson has elected to have his brain cryonically preserved in the event of medical death. He was involved early on in the creation of the Rationalist community through online weblogs.

Views

Tyler Cowen's book Discover Your Inner Economist includes a fairly detailed discussion of Hanson's views:

Nate Silver, in his book The Signal and the Noise (2012), writes:

Hanson is credited with originating the concept of the Policy Analysis Market (PAM), a DARPA project to implement a market for betting on future developments in the Middle East. Hanson has expressed great disappointment in DARPA's cancellation of its related FutureMAP project, and he attributes this to the controversy surrounding the related Total Information Awareness program. He also created and supports a proposed system of government called futarchy, where policies would be determined by prediction markets.

Hanson has also been criticised for his controversial take on the incel movement. In 2018 he wrote a blog post appearing to agree with the incel movement's likening of distribution of job opportunities to 'access to sex'. He found it puzzling that similar concern had not been shown to incels as to low income individuals. Hanson was criticized by some for discussing sex as if it was a commodity. 

Hanson has been criticized on a number of occasions for his writings relating to sexual relationships and women. "If you’ve ever heard of George Mason University economist Robin Hanson, there’s a good chance it was because he wrote something creepy," Slate columnist Jordan Weissman wrote in 2018. Bloomberg columnist Noah Smith cited a blog post by Hanson comparing cuckoldry to "gentle silent rape" in an article Smith wrote about bias against women in economics, lamenting that there was no retraction and no outcry from fellow economists. In the New Yorker, Jia Tolentino described this blog post as a "flippantly dehumanizing thought experiment".

A 2003 article in Fortune examined Hanson's work, noting, among other things, that he is a proponent of cryonics and that his ideas have found some acceptance among extropians on the Internet. He has since written extensively on the topic. Hanson also coined the term Great Filter, referring to whatever prevents "dead matter" from becoming an expanding and observable intelligent civilization. He was motivated to seek his doctorate so that his theories would reach a wider audience.

Books 
Hanson has written a book, The Age of Em, concerning his views on brain emulation and its eventual impact on society.

His 2018 book, The Elephant in the Brain, coauthored with Kevin Simler, looked at mental blind spots of society and individuals.

References

External links

 Overcoming Bias (Hanson's blog)
 GMU Page
 
 Bloggingheads.tv: interviews on Costly Truth-Seeking and The Economics of Artificial Intelligence (video & audio)
 
 NoDoom – Hanson's critique of the Doomsday argument
 Malthus v. the Singularity NY Times' John Tierney discusses Hanson's paper on the technological singularity

1959 births
Living people
George Mason University faculty
American transhumanists
Cryonicists
20th-century American economists
21st-century American economists
People associated with effective altruism